The 2008–09 Chicago Bulls season is the 43rd season of the franchise in the National Basketball Association (NBA).

In the playoffs, the Bulls lost to the defending NBA champions, the Boston Celtics, in seven games in the First Round. The defending champion Celtics were also taken to a seven game series the prior season in the first round against the Atlanta Hawks. They finished with a 41-41 record for the third time in their past four seasons.

Key dates
 June 26: The 2008 NBA draft took place in New York City.
 July 1: The free agency period started.

Offseason

The Bulls re-signed Luol Deng to a 6-year $71 million contract on July 30, 2008. Ben Gordon signed a 1-year contract on October 2, 2008.

NBA draft

Roster

Regular season

The Bulls were having a meager year floating under .500 and on February 18, 2009 they made their first of several trades sending Andrés Nocioni, Drew Gooden, Cedric Simmons, Michael Ruffin to the Sacramento Kings for Brad Miller and John Salmons. Then on February 19, 2009, the NBA trade deadline, the Bulls traded Larry Hughes to the New York Knicks for Tim Thomas, Jerome James, and Anthony Roberson. Later that day the Bulls made the third trade in a span of less than 24 hours sending swingman Thabo Sefolosha to the Oklahoma City Thunder for a 2009 first round pick.

The trades brought a late-season push for the Bulls, which finally clinched a playoff berth on April 10, 2009, their fourth in the last five years. Then on April 13, 2009 they clinched the 7th place in the east by beating the Detroit Pistons and remained .5 game ahead of Philadelphia 76ers for the 6th spot with one game remaining. The Bulls though lost their last game to Toronto and the 76ers beat Cleveland, who did not play most of its best players. The Bulls finished 7th even though they tied Philadelphia at 41-41. The Bulls got matched up with a Garnett-less Boston in the first round of the playoffs.

Season standings

Record vs. opponents

Game log

|- bgcolor="#bbffbb"
| 1
| October 28
| Milwaukee
| 
| Luol Deng (21)
| Tyrus Thomas (10)
| Derrick Rose (9)
| United Center21,762
| 1–0
|- bgcolor="#ffcccc"
| 2
| October 31
| @ Boston
| 
| Derrick Rose (18)
| Joakim Noah (13)
| Ben Gordon, Kirk Hinrich (3)
| TD Banknorth Garden18,624
| 1–1

|- bgcolor="#bbffbb"
| 3
| November 1
| Memphis
| 
| Derrick Rose (26)
| Drew Gooden (20)
| Kirk Hinrich, Ben Gordon (4)
| United Center21,785
| 2–1
|- bgcolor="#ffcccc"
| 4
| November 3
| @ Orlando
| 
| Drew Gooden (21)
| Andrés Nocioni, Luol Deng (7)
| Kirk Hinrich, Drew Gooden, Luol Deng (3)
| Amway Arena15,606
| 2–2
|- bgcolor="#ffcccc"
| 5
| November 5
| @ Cleveland
| 
| Ben Gordon (31)
| Drew Gooden (9)
| Derrick Rose (7)
| Quicken Loans Arena20,562
| 2–3
|- bgcolor="#bbffbb"
| 6
| November 7
| Phoenix
| 
| Ben Gordon (23)
| Joakim Noah (14)
| Ben Gordon, Derrick Rose (6)
| United Center21,967
| 3–3
|- bgcolor="#ffcccc"
| 7
| November 8
| Cleveland
| 
| Ben Gordon (29)
| Tyrus Thomas (8)
| Derrick Rose (9)
| United Center21,965
| 3–4
|- bgcolor="#ffcccc"
| 8
| November 11
| Atlanta
| 
| Derrick Rose (26)
| Derrick Rose, Luol Deng, Aaron Gray (10)
| Derrick Rose (6)
| United Center21,738
| 3–5
|- bgcolor="#bbffbb"
| 9
| November 13
| Dallas
| 
| Ben Gordon (35)
| Luol Deng, Derrick Rose (9)
| Derrick Rose (6)
| United Center21,751
| 4–5
|- bgcolor="#bbffbb"
| 10
| November 15
| Indiana
| 
| Derrick Rose (23)
| Andrés Nocioni (11)
| Derrick Rose (8)
| United Center21,759
| 5–5
|- bgcolor="#ffcccc"
| 11
| November 18
| @ L.A. Lakers
| 
| Derrick Rose (25)
| Andrés Nocioni (8)
| Derrick Rose (9)
| Staples Center18,997
| 5–6
|- bgcolor="#ffcccc"
| 12
| November 19
| @ Portland
| 
| Andrés Nocioni (13)
| Tyrus Thomas (7)
| Lindsey Hunter, Ben Gordon (3)
| Rose Garden20,599
| 5–7
|- bgcolor="#bbffbb"
| 13
| November 21
| @ Golden State
| 
| Larry Hughes (26)
| Drew Gooden (16)
| Derrick Rose (5)
| Oracle Arena19,596
| 6–7
|- bgcolor="#ffcccc"
| 14
| November 23
| @ Denver
| 
| Ben Gordon (28)
| Joakim Noah (9)
| Derrick Rose (6)
| Pepsi Center16,202
| 6–8
|- bgcolor="#bbffbb"
| 15
| November 24
| @ Utah
| 
| Derrick Rose (25)
| Tyrus Thomas (8)
| Derrick Rose (9)
| EnergySolutions Arena19,911
| 7–8
|- bgcolor="#ffcccc"
| 16
| November 26
| @ San Antonio
| 
| Ben Gordon (23)
| Drew Gooden (12)
| Derrick Rose (6)
| AT&T Center17,837
| 7–9
|- bgcolor="#bbffbb"
| 17
| November 30
| @ Philadelphia
| 
| Ben Gordon (21)
| Drew Gooden (12)
| Derrick Rose (10)
| Wachovia Center13,561
| 8–9

|- bgcolor="#ffcccc"
| 18
| December 2
| Philadelphia
| 
| Derrick Rose (24)
| Tyrus Thomas (13)
| Ben Gordon (4)
| United Center20,485
| 8–10
|- bgcolor="#ffcccc"
| 19
| December 3
| @ Milwaukee
| 
| Ben Gordon (22)
| Drew Gooden (9)
| Derrick Rose (9)
| Bradley Center13,684
| 8–11
|- bgcolor="#bbffbb"
| 20
| December 6
| Washington
| 
| Luol Deng (26)
| Drew Gooden (10)
| Derrick Rose (8)
| United Center21,741
| 9–11
|- bgcolor="#bbffbb"
| 21
| December 9
| New York
| 
| Drew Gooden (22)
| Drew Gooden (16)
| Derrick Rose (7)
| United Center19,519
| 10–11
|- bgcolor="#ffcccc"
| 22
| December 12
| @ Memphis
| 
| Ben Gordon (26)
| Drew Gooden (13)
| Derrick Rose (11)
| FedExForum17,132
| 10–12
|- bgcolor="#bbffbb"
| 23
| December 13
| New Jersey
| 
| Ben Gordon (29)
| Joakim Noah (8)
| Ben Gordon, Derrick Rose (6)
| United Center21,751
| 11–12
|- bgcolor="#ffcccc"
| 24
| December 16
| @ Charlotte
| 
| Ben Gordon (25)
| Tyrus Thomas, Drew Gooden (9)
| Derrick Rose (7)
| Time Warner Cable Arena11,225
| 11–13
|- bgcolor="#bbffbb"
| 25
| December 17
| L.A. Clippers
| 
| Andrés Nocioni, Ben Gordon (22)
| Drew Gooden (11)
| Derrick Rose (7)
| United Center20,102
| 12–13
|- bgcolor="#ffcccc"
| 26
| December 19
| @ Boston
| 
| Luol Deng (19)
| Aaron Gray (8)
| Derrick Rose (5)
| TD Banknorth Garden18,624
| 12–14
|- bgcolor="#bbffbb"
| 27
| December 20
| Utah
| 
| Ben Gordon (26)
| Joakim Noah (9)
| Ben Gordon, Derrick Rose, Andrés Nocioni (3)
| United Center22,046
| 13–14
|- bgcolor="#ffcccc"
| 28
| December 23
| @ Detroit
| 
| Larry Hughes (19)
| Tyrus Thomas (12)
| Ben Gordon (7)
| The Palace of Auburn Hills22,076
| 13–15
|- bgcolor="#ffcccc"
| 29
| December 26
| @ Miami
| 
| Ben Gordon (15)
| Aaron Gray (11)
| Derrick Rose (3)
| American Airlines Arena19,600
| 13–16
|- bgcolor="#ffcccc"
| 30
| December 27
| @ Atlanta
| 
| Ben Gordon (33)
| Tyrus Thomas (9)
| Derrick Rose (7)
| Philips Arena18,031
| 13–17
|- bgcolor="#bbffbb"
| 31
| December 29
| @ New Jersey
| 
| Ben Gordon (24)
| Andrés Nocioni (8)
| Derrick Rose (13)
| Izod Center18,786
| 14–17
|- bgcolor="#ffcccc"
| 32
| December 31
| Orlando
| 
| Joakim Noah (19)
| Joakim Noah (11)
| Thabo Sefolosha, Andrés Nocioni (4)
| United Center21,861
| 14–18

|- bgcolor="#ffcccc"
| 33
| January 2
| @ Cleveland
| 
| Ben Gordon (22)
| Joakim Noah (10)
| Ben Gordon (4)
| Quicken Loans Arena20,562
| 14–19
|- bgcolor="#ffcccc"
| 34
| January 3
| Minnesota
| 
| Derrick Rose (22)
| Aaron Gray (9)
| Ben Gordon (6)
| United Center20,516
| 14–20
|- bgcolor="#bbffbb"
| 35
| January 6
| Sacramento
| 
| Ben Gordon (24)
| Drew Gooden (10)
| Derrick Rose (8)
| United Center18,060
| 15–20
|- bgcolor="#bbffbb"
| 36
| January 9
| Washington
| 
| Ben Gordon (22)
| Drew Gooden (11)
| Derrick Rose (9)
| United Center20,125
| 16–20
|- bgcolor="#ffcccc"
| 37
| January 10
| Oklahoma City
| 
| Ben Gordon (22)
| Drew Gooden (12)
| Derrick Rose (6)
| United Center20,469
| 16–21
|- bgcolor="#ffcccc"
| 38
| January 12
| Portland
| 
| Drew Gooden (22)
| Drew Gooden (9)
| Derrick Rose (10)
| United Center18,996
| 16–22
|- bgcolor="#bbffbb"
| 39
| January 14
| @ Toronto
| 
| Derrick Rose (25)
| Luol Deng (14)
| Derrick Rose (10)
| Air Canada Centre18,494
| 17–22
|- bgcolor="#bbffbb"
| 40
| January 15
| Cleveland
| 
| Luol Deng (22)
| Luol Deng (8)
| Derrick Rose (6)
| United Center21,297
| 18–22
|- bgcolor="#ffcccc"
| 41
| January 17
| San Antonio
| 
| Ben Gordon (20)
| Andrés Nocioni (15)
| Derrick Rose (8)
| United Center22,100
| 18–23
|- bgcolor="#ffcccc"
| 42
| January 19
| @ New York
| 
| Luol Deng, Derrick Rose (20)
| Joakim Noah (18)
| Derrick Rose (8)
| Madison Square Garden18,807
| 18–24
|- bgcolor="#ffcccc"
| 43
| January 20
| Atlanta
| 
| Ben Gordon (21)
| Joakim Noah (11)
| Kirk Hinrich (8)
| United Center20,389
| 18–25
|- bgcolor="#ffcccc"
| 44
| January 23
| Toronto
| 
| Ben Gordon (19)
| Aaron Gray (7)
| Kirk Hinrich (7)
| United Center20,886
| 18–26
|- bgcolor="#ffcccc"
| 45
| January 25
| @ Minnesota
| 
| Ben Gordon (23)
| Joakim Noah (10)
| Derrick Rose (7)
| Target Center16,009
| 18–27
|- bgcolor="#bbffbb"
| 46
| January 28
| @ L.A. Clippers
| 
| Luol Deng (23)
| Tyrus Thomas (10)
| Ben Gordon (8)
| Staples Center15,637
| 19–27
|- bgcolor="#bbffbb"
| 47
| January 30
| @ Sacramento
| 
| Ben Gordon, Luol Deng (20)
| Tyrus Thomas (10)
| Derrick Rose (11)
| ARCO Arena13,356
| 20–27
|- bgcolor="#bbffbb"
| 48
| January 31
| @ Phoenix
| 
| Derrick Rose, Ben Gordon (26)
| Luol Deng (10)
| Kirk Hinrich, Ben Gordon (6)
| US Airways Center18,422
| 21–27

|- bgcolor="#ffcccc"
| 49
| February 3
| @ Houston
| 
| Luol Deng (28)
| Tyrus Thomas (13)
| Derrick Rose (7)
| Toyota Center16,653
| 21–28
|- bgcolor="#bbffbb"
| 50
| February 4
| @ New Orleans
| 
| Derrick Rose (21)
| Tyrus Thomas (10)
| Ben Gordon (7)
| New Orleans Arena16,270
| 22–28
|- bgcolor="#ffcccc"
| 51
| February 7
| @ Dallas
| 
| Ben Gordon (28)
| Tyrus Thomas (12)
| Derrick Rose (9)
| American Airlines Center20,349
| 22–29
|- bgcolor="#bbffbb"
| 52
| February 10
| Detroit
| 
| Ben Gordon (24)
| Joakim Noah (16)
| Kirk Hinrich (5)
| United Center21,896
| 23–29
|- bgcolor="#ffcccc"
| 53
| February 12
| Miami
| 
| Ben Gordon (34)
| Joakim Noah (11)
| Derrick Rose (6)
| United Center21,801
| 23–30
|- bgcolor="#bbffbb"
| 54
| February 18
| @ Milwaukee
| 
| Kirk Hinrich (31)
| Joakim Noah (9)
| Derrick Rose (9)
| Bradley Center15,309
| 24–30
|- bgcolor="#bbffbb"
| 55
| February 20
| Denver
| 
| Ben Gordon (37)
| Luol Deng, Tyrus Thomas (12)
| Kirk Hinrich (8)
| United Center21,790
| 25–30
|- bgcolor="#ffcccc"
| 56
| February 22
| @ Indiana
| 
| Ben Gordon (28)
| Joakim Noah (12)
| Derrick Rose (8)
| Conseco Fieldhouse17,083
| 25–31
|- bgcolor="#bbffbb"
| 57
| February 24
| Orlando
| 
| Derrick Rose (22)
| Joakim Noah (8)
| Derrick Rose, Brad Miller (5)
| United Center21,902
| 26–31
|- bgcolor="#ffcccc"
| 58
| February 25
| @ New Jersey
| 
| Ben Gordon (17)
| Tyrus Thomas (11)
| Kirk Hinrich, Derrick Rose (5)
| Izod Center14,075
| 26–32
|- bgcolor="#ffcccc"
| 59
| February 27
| @ Washington
| 
| John Salmons (25)
| Brad Miller (11)
| Luol Deng, John Salmons, Derrick Rose (3)
| Verizon Center18,114
| 26–33
|- bgcolor="#bbffbb"
| 60
| February 28
| Houston
| 
| Derrick Rose (22)
| Joakim Noah (15)
| Derrick Rose (7)
| United Center22,394
| 27–33

|- bgcolor="#ffcccc"
| 61
| March 3
| @ Charlotte
| 
| Ben Gordon, Tyrus Thomas (14)
| Tyrus Thomas (12)
| Derrick Rose (5)
| Time Warner Cable Arena14,216
| 27–34
|- bgcolor="#bbffbb"
| 62
| March 4
| Golden State
| 
| John Salmons (23)
| Joakim Noah (17)
| Derrick Rose, Kirk Hinrich (6)
| United Center20,108
| 28–34
|- bgcolor="#bbffbb"
| 63
| March 6
| Milwaukee
| 
| Ben Gordon (34)
| Joakim Noah (13)
| Ben Gordon (7)
| United Center21,186
| 29–34
|- bgcolor="#ffcccc"
| 64
| March 9
| @ Miami
| 
| Ben Gordon (43)
| Joakim Noah (15)
| Ben Gordon, Derrick Rose, Brad Miller, Kirk Hinrich (3)
| American Airlines Arena19,600
| 29–35
|- bgcolor="#ffcccc"
| 65
| March 11
| @ Orlando
| 
| John Salmons (18)
| John Salmons (8)
| Derrick Rose (3)
| Amway Arena17,461
| 29–36
|- bgcolor="#ffcccc"
| 66
| March 13
| @ Philadelphia
| 
| Derrick Rose (20)
| Joakim Noah (9)
| Derrick Rose (6)
| Wachovia Center17,563
| 29–37
|- bgcolor="#bbffbb"
| 67
| March 14
| New Orleans
| 
| Ben Gordon (27)
| Brad Miller, Joakim Noah (9)
| Derrick Rose (7)
| United Center22,135
| 30–37
|- bgcolor="#bbffbb"
| 68
| March 17
| Boston
| 
| John Salmons (38)
| Brad Miller (14)
| Derrick Rose (8)
| United Center22,107
| 31–37
|- bgcolor="#bbffbb"
| 69
| March 18
| @ Oklahoma City
| 
| Derrick Rose (25)
| Tyrus Thomas (11)
| Brad Miller (5)
| Ford Center19,136
| 32–37
|- bgcolor="#ffcccc"
| 70
| March 21
| L.A. Lakers
| 
| John Salmons (30)
| Tyrus Thomas (16)
| Ben Gordon (6)
| United Center23,011
| 32–38
|- bgcolor="#bbffbb"
| 71
| March 23
| @ Washington
| 
| Ben Gordon (21)
| Joakim Noah (12)
| Derrick Rose (8)
| Verizon Center15,421
| 33–38
|- bgcolor="#bbffbb"
| 72
| March 24
| Detroit
| 
| Kirk Hinrich (24)
| Tyrus Thomas (12)
| Kirk Hinrich (8)
| United Center20,502
| 34–38
|- bgcolor="#bbffbb"
| 73
| March 26
| Miami
| 
| John Salmons (27)
| Tyrus Thomas (12)
| Derrick Rose (7)
| United Center21,908
| 35–38
|- bgcolor="#bbffbb"
| 74
| March 28
| Indiana
| 
| Ben Gordon (25)
| Derrick Rose (9)
| Derrick Rose (8)
| United Center20,756
| 36–38
|- bgcolor="#ffcccc"
| 75
| March 29
| @ Toronto
| 
| Ben Gordon (37)
| Brad Miller (10)
| Derrick Rose (9)
| Air Canada Centre18,949
| 36–39
|- bgcolor="#ffcccc"
| 76
| March 31
| @ Indiana
| 
| Derrick Rose (24)
| Derrick Rose (11)
| Brad Miller (8)
| Conseco Fieldhouse15,687
| 36–40

|- bgcolor="#bbffbb"
| 77
| April 4
| New Jersey
| 
| Ben Gordon (18)
| Joakim Noah (10)
| Derrick Rose, Kirk Hinrich (5)
| United Center21,424
| 37–40
|- bgcolor="#bbffbb"
| 78
| April 7
| New York
| 
| Kirk Hinrich (25)
| Brad Miller (12)
| John Salmons, Derrick Rose (6)
| United Center20,764
| 38–40
|- bgcolor="#bbffbb"
| 79
| April 9
| Philadelphia
| 
| Ben Gordon, Tyrus Thomas (24)
| Ben Gordon, Joakim Noah (7)
| Derrick Rose (8)
| United Center20,791
| 39–40
|- bgcolor="#bbffbb"
| 80
| April 11
| Charlotte
| 
| Ben Gordon (39)
| Joakim Noah (10)
| Derrick Rose, Joakim Noah (7)
| United Center20,265
| 40–40
|- bgcolor="#bbffbb"
| 81
| April 13
| @ Detroit
| 
| Derrick Rose (24)
| Joakim Noah (13)
| Derrick Rose (8)
| The Palace of Auburn Hills22,076
| 41–40
|- bgcolor="#ffcccc"
| 82
| April 15
| Toronto
| 
| Ben Gordon (23)
| Brad Miller (11)
| Derrick Rose (11)
| United Center20,677
| 41–41

Playoffs
The Bulls-Celtics series became the first playoff series in NBA history to have 4 games go into overtime.

|- bgcolor="#bbffbb"
| 1
| April 18
| @ Boston
| 
| Derrick Rose (36)
| Joakim Noah (17)
| Derrick Rose (11)
| TD Banknorth Garden18,624
| 1–0
|- bgcolor="#ffcccc"
| 2
| April 20
| @ Boston
| 
| Ben Gordon (42)
| Brad Miller (9)
| Kirk Hinrich (7)
| TD Banknorth Garden18,624
| 1–1
|- bgcolor="#ffcccc"
| 3
| April 23
| Boston
| 
| Ben Gordon (15)
| Joakim Noah (10)
| 3 players tied (3)
| United Center23,072
| 1–2
|- bgcolor="#bbffbb"
| 4
| April 26
| Boston
| 
| Derrick Rose (23)
| Derrick Rose (11)
| Derrick Rose (9)
| United Center23,067
| 2–2
|- bgcolor="#ffcccc"
| 5
| April 28
| @ Boston
| 
| Ben Gordon (26)
| Joakim Noah (17)
| Gordon, Rose (6)
| TD Banknorth Garden18,624
| 2–3
|- bgcolor="#bbffbb"
| 6
| April 30
| Boston
| 
| John Salmons (35)
| Joakim Noah (15)
| Rose, Hinrich (7)
| United Center23,430
| 3–3
|- bgcolor="#ffcccc"
| 7
| May 2
| @ Boston
| 
| Ben Gordon (33)
| Joakim Noah (15)
| Ben Gordon (4)
| TD Banknorth Garden18,624
| 3–4
|-
| colspan=11 align="center"|
Legend:

Player statistics

Season

| 
| 49 || 46 || 34.0 || .448 || .400 || .796 || 6.0 || 1.9 || 1.22 || 0.51 || 14.1
|-
| 
| 31 || 27 || 29.6 || .457 || .000 || style="background:black;color:#d40026;" | .866 || style="background:black;color:#d40026;" | 8.6 || 1.4 || 0.84 || 0.45 || 13.1
|-
| 
| style="background:black;color:#d40026;" | 82 || 76 || 36.6 || .455 || .410 || .864 || 3.5 || 3.4 || 0.87 || 0.27 || style="background:black;color:#d40026;" | 20.7
|-
| 
| 56 || 18 || 12.8 || .485 || .000 || .576 || 3.9 || 0.8 || 0.25 || 0.32 || 3.5
|-
| 
| 51 || 4 || 26.3 || .437 || .408 || .791 || 2.4 || 3.9 || style="background:black;color:#d40026;" | 1.29 || 0.37 || 9.9
|-
| 
| 30 || 6 || 26.4 || .412 || .392 || .817 || 3.1 || 2.0 || 1.20 || 0.30 || 12.0
|-
| 
| 28 || 0 || 9.5 || .329 || .333 || .600 || 0.4 || 1.3 || 0.71 || 0.04 || 2.6
|-
| 
| 8 || 0 || 5.3 || .364 || style="background:black;color:#d40026;" | .500 || .000 || 1.0 || 0.3 || 0.13 || 0.00 || 1.1
|-
| 
| 27 || 0 || 27.6 || .478 || .231 || .853 || 7.4 || 3.2 || 0.81 || 0.44 || 11.8
|-
| 
| 2 || 0 || 2.5 || .250 || .000 || .000 || 0.0 || 0.5 || 0.00 || 0.00 || 1.0
|-
| 
| 80 || 55 || 24.2 || style="background:black;color:#d40026;" | .556 || .000 || .676 || 7.6 || 1.3 || 0.61 || 1.38 || 6.7
|-
| 
| 53 || 2 || 24.1 || .414 || .378 || .806 || 4.2 || 1.1 || 0.49 || 0.30 || 10.4
|-
| 
| 6 || 0 || 3.8 || .294 || .200 || .000 || 1.2 || 0.2 || 0.00 || 0.00 || 2.0
|-
| 
| 81 || style="background:black;color:#d40026;" | 80 || 37.0 || .475 || .222 || .788 || 3.9 || style="background:black;color:#d40026;" | 6.3 || 0.81 || 0.22 || 16.8
|-
| 
| 26 || 21 || style="background:black;color:#d40026;" | 37.7 || .473 || .415 || .843 || 4.3 || 2.0 || 0.96 || 0.58 || 18.3
|-
| 
| 43 || 14 || 17.1 || .434 || .300 || .840 || 2.9 || 1.5 || 0.81 || 0.44 || 4.5
|-
| 
| 11 || 0 || 5.5 || .524 || .000 || .429 || 1.1 || 0.2 || 0.09 || 0.36 || 2.5
|-
| 
| 18 || 0 || 14.1 || .400 || .442 || .700 || 2.3 || 0.7 || 0.33 || 0.00 || 5.8
|-
| 
| 79 || 61 || 27.5 || .451 || .333 || .783 || 6.4 || 1.0 || 1.15 || style="background:black;color:#d40026;" | 1.91 || 10.8
|-
|}
*Statistics with the Chicago Bulls

Playoffs

Awards and records

Awards
 Derrick Rose = Rookie of the Year
 Derrick Rose won the All-Star Weekend Skills Challenge
 Derrick Rose was named to the NBA All-Rookie First Team

Records
 4—Overtime games played in this series
 7—Overtime periods played in this series, more than any other NBA team has played in an entire postseason.

Transactions

Draft picks
The Bulls beat the odds and won the NBA Draft Lottery on May 20, 2008. The Bulls vaulted from the ninth spot to win the NBA Draft Lottery in Secaucus, NJ, and obtain the first pick in the June 26 NBA Draft. Chicago had a 1.7 percent chance of winning and were represented by Executive Vice President, Business Operations Steve Schanwald. The Heat had the best odds of securing the top selection and will pick second followed by the Timberwolves and Sonics.

Trades
{| cellspacing="0"
| valign="top" |

Free agents

Additions

Subtractions

References

External links

Chicago Bulls seasons
Chicago
Chicago
Chicago